In Greek mythology, Priapus is a minor rustic fertility god, protector of livestock, fruit plants, gardens and male genitalia. Priapus is marked by his oversized, permanent erection, which gave rise to the medical term priapism. He became a popular figure in Roman erotic art and Latin literature, and is the subject of the often humorously obscene collection of verse called the Priapeia.

Mythology

Relationship with other deities
Priapus was described in varying sources as the son of Aphrodite by Dionysus; as the son of Dionysus and Chione; as perhaps the father or son of Hermes; or as the son of Zeus or Pan. According to legend, Hera cursed him with inconvenient impotence (he could not sustain an erection when the time came for sexual intercourse), ugliness and foul-mindedness while he was still in Aphrodite's womb, in revenge for the hero Paris having the temerity to judge Aphrodite more beautiful than Hera. In another account, Hera's anger and curse were because the baby had been fathered by her husband Zeus. The other gods refused to allow him to live on Mount Olympus and threw him down to Earth, leaving him on a hillside. He was eventually found by shepherds and was brought up by them.

Priapus joined Pan and the satyrs as a spirit of fertility and growth, though he was perennially frustrated by his impotence. In a ribald anecdote told by Ovid, he attempted to rape the goddess Hestia but was thwarted by an ass, whose braying caused him to lose his erection at the critical moment and woke Hestia. The episode gave him a lasting hatred of asses and a willingness to see them killed in his honour. The emblem of his lustful nature was his permanent erection and his large penis. Another myth states that he pursued the nymph Lotis until the gods took pity on her and turned her into a lotus plant.

Other works 
As well as the collection known as the Priapeia mentioned above, Priapus was a frequent figure in Latin erotic or mythological verse.

In Ovid's Fasti, the nymph Lotis fell into a drunken slumber at a feast, and Priapus seized this opportunity to advance upon her. With stealth he approached, and just before he could embrace her, Silenus's donkey alerted the party with "raucous braying". Lotis awoke and pushed Priapus away, but her only true escape was to be transformed into the lotus tree. To punish the donkey for spoiling his opportunity, Priapus bludgeoned it to death with his gargantuan phallus. When the same story is recounted later in the same book, Lotis is replaced with the virginal goddess Hestia, who avoids being changed into a tree as the other Olympians come to her rescue. Ovid's anecdote served to explain why donkeys were sacrificed to Priapus in the city of Lampsacus on the Hellespont, where he was worshipped among the offspring of Hermes.

Once, a donkey that had been given human speech by Dionysus challenged Priapus to a contest about which between them had the better penis. Priapus won the contest, and then killed the donkey, which was put by Dionysus among the stars.

Worship and attributes

The first extant mention of Priapus is in the eponymous comedy Priapus, written in the 4th century BC by Xenarchus. Originally worshipped by Greek colonists in Lampsacus in Asia Minor, the cult of Priapus spread to mainland Greece and eventually to Italy during the 3rd century BC. Lucian (De saltatione) tells that in Bithynia Priapus was accounted as a warlike god, a rustic tutor to the infant Ares, "who taught him dancing first and war only afterwards," Karl Kerenyi observed. Arnobius is aware of the importance accorded Priapus in this region near the Hellespont. Also, Pausanias notes:

In later antiquity, his worship meant little more than a cult of sophisticated pornography.

Outside his "home" region in Asia Minor, Priapus was regarded as something of a joke by urban dwellers. However, he played a more important role in the countryside, where he was seen as a guardian deity. He was regarded as the patron god of sailors and fishermen and others in need of good luck, and his presence was believed to avert the evil eye.

Priapus does not appear to have had an organized cult and was mostly worshiped in gardens or homes, though there are attestations of temples dedicated to the god. His sacrificial animal was the ass, but agricultural offerings (such as fruit, flowers, vegetables and fish) were also very common.

Long after the fall of Rome and the rise of Christianity, Priapus continued to be invoked as a symbol of health and fertility. The 13th century Lanercost Chronicle, a history of northern England and Scotland, records a "lay Cistercian brother" erecting a statue of Priapus (simulacrum Priapi statuere) in an attempt to end an outbreak of cattle disease.

In the 1980s, D. F. Cassidy founded the St. Priapus Church as a modern church centred on worship of the phallus.

Patron of merchant sailing 
Priapus' role as a patron god for merchant sailors in ancient Greece and Rome is that of a protector and navigational aide. Recent shipwreck evidence contains apotropaic items carried on board by mariners in the forms of a terracotta phallus, wooden Priapus figure, and bronze sheath from a military ram. Coinciding with the use of wooden Priapic markers erected in areas of dangerous passage or particular landing areas for sailors, the function of Priapus is much more extensive than previously thought.

Although Priapus is commonly associated with the failed attempts of rape against the nymphs Lotis and Vesta in Ovid's comedy Fasti and the rather flippant treatment of the deity in urban settings, Priapus' protection traits can be traced back to the importance placed on the phallus in ancient times (particularly his association with fertility and garden protection). In Greece, the phallus was thought of to have a mind of its own, animal-like, separate from the mind and control of the man.  The phallus is also associated with "possession and territorial demarcation" in many cultures, attributing to Priapus' other role as a navigational deity.

Marriage ceremony of firstborn conception 
Throughout the ancient Mediterranean, Middle East and even into India, images of Priapus (or  Hermes, or some other phallic deity) with a phallus were used in deflowering rituals of newlywed, virgin brides. Though the bride would later consummate the marriage with her husband, the deity was said to impregnate her with her firstborn child. In early times, this child begotten of the deity was sometimes then offered back to the deity as a sacrifice, just as the first fruits of all kinds were offered to the deity who provided them. Though the ancient Romans long ended human sacrifice at the time of Priapus’ introduction into their culture, they still held this ceremony of firstborn conception. As Christianity equated ithyphallic deities with the Devil, these rituals were perceived as immoral and demonic.

Depictions

Priapus' iconic attribute was his priapism (permanently erect penis); he probably absorbed some pre-existing ithyphallic deities as his cult developed. He was represented in a variety of ways, most commonly as a misshapen gnome-like figure with an enormous erect phallus. Statues of Priapus were common in ancient Greece and Rome, standing in gardens. The Athenians often conflated Priapus with Hermes, the god of boundaries, and depicted a hybrid deity with a winged helmet, sandals, and huge erection.

Another attribute of Priapus was the sickle which he often carries in his right hand. This too was used to threaten thieves, doubtless with castration: Horace (Sat. 1.8.1–7) writes:

Olim truncus eram ficulnus, inutile lignum,cum faber, incertus scamnum faceretne Priapum,maluit esse deum. deus inde ego, furum aviumquemaxima formido; nam fures dextra coercetobscenoque ruber porrectus ab inguine palus;ast importunes volucres in vertice harundoterret fixa vetatque novis considere in hortis.
"Once I was a trunk of fig, a useless piece of wood,when a carpenter, unsure whether he should make a bench or a Priapus,decided to make a god. So I am a god, of thieves and birdsa very great scarer; for my right hand curbs thieves,as does the red pole which projects from my indecent groin;but as for the importunate birds, the reed fixed on my headterrifies them and forbids them to settle in the new gardens."

A number of epigrams, apparently written as if to adorn shrines of Priapus, were collected in the Priapeia. In these, Priapus frequently threatens sexual assault against potential thieves:

Percidere, puer, moneo; futuere, puella;   barbatum furem tertia poena manet.
"I warn you, boy, you will be screwed; girl, you will be laid with;   a third penalty awaits the bearded thief."

Femina si furtum faciet mihi virve puerve,   haec cunnum, caput hic praebeat, ille nates.
"If a woman steals from me, or a man, or a boy,   let the first give me her cunt, the second his head, the third his buttocks."per medios ibit pueros mediasque puellas   mentula; barbatis non-nisi summa petet."My dick will go through the middle of boys and the middle of girls,   but with bearded men it will aim only for the top."

A number of Roman paintings of Priapus have survived. One of the most famous images of Priapus is that from the House of the Vettii in Pompeii. A fresco depicts the god weighing his phallus against a large bag of coins. In nearby Herculaneum, an excavated snack bar has a painting of Priapus behind the bar, apparently as a good-luck symbol for the customers.

Modern derivations

Medical terminology
The medical condition priapism derives its name from Priapus, alluding to the god's permanently engorged penis.

Natural history
 The group of worm-like marine burrowing animals known as the Priapulidea, literally "penis worms", also derives its name from Priapus.
 Mutinus caninus, a woodland fungus, draws its first name from Priapus's Roman name, due to its phallic shape.

See also
 Priapeia
 Tintinnabulum (Ancient Rome)
 Latin obscenity
 Sexuality in ancient Rome
 Karabiga, Turkey, formerly known as Priapus
 Richard Payne Knight
 Orchis

References

Notes

Bibliography
 Brown, Emerson, Jr. "Hortus Inconclusus: The Significance of Priapus and Pyramus and Thisbe in the Merchant's Tale". Chaucer Review 4.1 (1970): 31–40.
 “Priapus and the Parlement of Foulys”. Studies in Philology 72 (1975): 258–74.
 Coronato, Rocco. “The Emergence of Priapism in the Two Gentlemen of Verona”. In Proteus: The Language of Metamorphosis, ed. Carla Dente, George Ferzoco, Miriam Gill and Marina Spunta. Aldershot: Ashgate, 2005, chapter 8, 93–101.
 Delord, Frédéric. "Priapus".  2009.  In A Dictionary of Shakespeare's Classical Mythology (2009–), ed. Yves Peyré.
 "'O, the difference of man and man!' (IV.ii.26): Références et différences génitales dans King Lear" in Autour de King Lear, ed. A. Lafont and M.-C. Munoz, with F. Delord. Montpellier: IRCL, February 2009.
 Érubescences et turgescences dans l’imaginaire shakespearien et la culture de la Renaissance, thèse dactylographiée (Ph.D). Montpellier : Université Montpellier III – Paul Valéry, 2008.
 Franz, David O. "Leud Priapians and Renaissance Pornography". SEL: Studies in English Literature 1500–1900 12, n°1 (winter 1972): 157–72.
 Morel, Philippe. "Priape à la Renaissance: Les guirlandes de Giovanni da Udine à la Farnésine". Revue de l’Art 69 (1985): 13–28.
 Peyré, Yves. "Priape dénaturé: Remarques sur les Apotheseos…Deorum Libri Tres de Georges Pictor et leur adaptation anglaise par Stephen Batman". Influences latines en Europe'' (Cahiers de l’Europe Classique et Néo-Latine). Toulouse: Travaux de l’Université de Toulouse – Le Mirail, A.23 (1983): 61–87.

External links

 
 Britannica Online Encyclopedia
 Dictionary of Greek and Roman Biography and Mythology 
 Priapos: Greek & Mysian God of Gardens and Fertility – Theoi Project

Fertility gods
Priapists
Agricultural gods
Children of Aphrodite
Children of Dionysus
Children of Zeus
Greek gods
Sexuality in ancient Rome
Phallic symbols
Deeds of Hera
LGBT themes in Greek mythology
Mythological Greek tutors of gods
Harvest deities
Donkey deities
Children of Hermes
Sexuality in ancient Greece